Maria Gainza (born December 25, 1975, Buenos Aires) is an Argentine art critic and writer.

She is a granddaughter of Alberto Gainza Paz, who was director of the newspaper La Prensa.

She began publishing her first articles about art for newspapers and cultural supplements in 2003.She has been a regular contributor to Artforum magazine for more than ten years. She also wrote in the Radar supplement of the newspaper Página/12. She has taught courses for artists at the Center for Artistic Research and art criticism workshops at Torcuato di Tella University. In 2017, she won the Konex Award in the Visual Arts category. 

She was co-editor of the collection on Argentine art "Los Sentidos", by Adriana Hidalgo Editora.  

Optic Nerve (published in 2014 by Editorial Mansalva), her first foray into narrative, has been translated into ten languages. 

In 2018, she published The Black Light (published by Editorial Anagrama), a detective novel that deals with the art market and forgery through the lives of four woemn.

In 2019 she received Sor Juana Inés de la Cruz Prize for "La luz negra".

Literary works

Novels 

 The Optic Nerve (Catapult Press, 2022, trans. by Thomas Bunstead)
 Portrait of An Unknown Lady (Catapult Press, 2022, trans. by Thomas Bunstead)

Poetry 
 Un imperio por otro (Editorial Mansalva, 2021)

Essays 

 Textos elegidos 2003-2010 (Capital Intelectual, 2011) 
 Una vida crítica (Clave Intelectual, 2020)

References

External links 
 
  An extract from Optic Nerve.
 Books in Anagrama editorial
 Articles in Artforum magazine

Argentine women writers
Writers from Buenos Aires
21st-century novelists
1975 births
Living people